The following radio stations broadcast on FM frequency 95.7 MHz:

Argentina
 Cable a Tierra in Salta
 LRM702 RT 21 in Sunchales, Santa Fe
 LRM729 Del Centro in Gálvez, Santa Fe
 Net in San Nicolás de los Arroyos, Buenos Aires
 Radio Cristiana in Rosario, Santa Fe.
 Radio María in Berrotarán, Córdoba
 Universal Coronel Dorrego in Coronel Dorrego, Buenos Aires
 Universidad in Mar del Plata, Buenos Aires.
 Universo in San Francisco, Córdoba

Australia
 ABC Classic FM in Wollongong, New South Wales
 Triple J in Yulara, Northern Territory
 4PNN in Gold Coast, Queensland
 Hot FM (Australian radio network) in Bunbury, Western Australia
 3GDR Golden Days Radio in Melbourne, Victoria

Canada (Channel 239)
 CBK-FM-4 in Swift Current, Saskatchewan
 CBQS-FM in Sioux Narrows, Ontario
 CBWX-FM in Fisher Branch, Manitoba
 CFJB-FM in Barrie, Ontario
 CFPW-FM in Powell River, British Columbia
 CHBI-FM in Burnt Islands, Newfoundland and Labrador
 CHGO-FM-1 in Rouyn-Noranda, Quebec
 CIWF-FM in Big River Reserve, Saskatchewan
 CJAT-FM in Trail, British Columbia
 CJNE-FM-1 in Tisdale, Saskatchewan
 CJNI-FM in Halifax, Nova Scotia
 CJOK-1-FM in Tar Island, Alberta
 CKAV-FM-9 in Ottawa, Ontario
 CKEA-FM in Edmonton, Alberta
 CKIJ-FM in St. John's, Newfoundland and Labrador
 CKLS-FM in Lytton, Quebec
 CKRP-FM in Falher, Alberta
 CKTP-FM in Fredericton, New Brunswick
 CKYK-FM in Alma, Quebec
 CKYQ-FM in Plessisville, Quebec
 VF2333 in Gillam, Manitoba

China 
 CNR The Voice of China in Ningbo

Ireland
Shannonside FM in Boyle, County Roscommon

Malaysia
 8FM in Kota Kinabalu, Sabah
 Miri FM in Miri, Sarawak
 Mutiara FM in Penang and Northern Perak

Mexico
XHAGA-FM in Aguascalientes, Aguascalientes
XHATF-FM in Atlacomulco, State of Mexico
XHBAC-FM in Bahía Asunción, Baja California Sur
XHBK-FM in Nuevo Laredo, Tamaulipas

XHBV-FM in Moroleón, Guanajuato
XHCE-FM in Oaxaca, Oaxaca
XHCK-FM in Durango, Durango

XHCT-FM in Cuernavaca, Morelos
XHCTS-FM in Comitán de Dominguez, Chiapas
XHLBC-FM in Loreto, Baja California Sur
XHLCM-FM in Lázaro Cárdenas, Michoacán
XHMFS-FM in Mochicahui, El Fuerte Municipality, Sinaloa
XHMY-FM in Mineral del Monte, Hidalgo
XHOTE-FM in Mecayapan, Veracruz
XHPEBX-FM in Cintalapa de Figueroa, Chiapas
XHPEEC-FM in Cihuatlán, Jalisco

XHQD-FM in Chihuahua, Chihuahua
XHRK-FM in Monterrey, Nuevo León
XHRLA-FM in Santa Rosalía, Baja California Sur

XHSDM-FM in Santo Domingo, Chiapas
XHTAB-FM in Villahermosa, Tabasco
XHUPC-FM in Mexico City
XHXO-FM in Ciudad Mante, Tamaulipas

Philippines

DXBL in Cagayan De Oro City

Saint Vincent and the Grenadines
 Praise FM (Saint Vincent and the Grenadines)

United Kingdom
BBC Radio Devon in Plymouth
Penistone FM in Penistone, South Yorkshire

United States (Channel 239)
 KALF in Red Bluff, California
 KBFA-LP in West Monroe, Louisiana
 KBGO in Waco, Texas
  in Medford, Oregon
  in Big Spring, Texas
 KCGM in Scobey, Montana
  in Ottawa, Kansas
 KCJP-LP in El Centro, California
 KCOV-LP in Gillette, Wyoming
  in Duluth, Minnesota
 KDHT in Denver, Colorado
 KDRT-LP in Davis, California
 KETI-LP in Choteau, Montana
  in Twin Falls, Idaho
 KGMZ-FM in San Francisco, California
 KJEB in Seattle, Washington
  in Fresno, California
 KKAJ-FM in Davis, Oklahoma
 KKHH in Houston, Texas
  in Morris, Minnesota
  in Walla Walla, Washington
 KLEA in Hobbs, New Mexico
  in Jourdanton, Texas
  in Minden, Louisiana
 KLME in Langdon, North Dakota
 KLYN-LP in Las Vegas, New Mexico
 KMFH-LP in Oskaloosa, Iowa
 KMKO-FM in Lake Crystal-Mankato, Minnesota
 KNNA-LP in Lincoln, Nebraska
 KOSY-FM in Anamosa, Iowa
 KOWN-LP in Omaha, Nebraska
  in Orcutt, California
  in Farmington, New Mexico
 KPKR in Parker, Arizona
 KPUR-FM in Claude, Texas
 KQLZ in New England, North Dakota
 KQSF in Dell Rapids, South Dakota
 KQWC-FM in Webster City, Iowa
 KRCO-FM in Prineville, Oregon
  in Grand Island, Nebraska
 KROK (FM) in South Fort Polk, Louisiana
 KRRH-LP in Edinburg, Texas
  in Bentonville, Arkansas
  in Little Rock, Arkansas
 KSSX in Carlsbad, California
  in Atlantic, Iowa
 KUGA-LP in Sacramento, California
 KURC-LP in Bastrop, Louisiana
 KUTC in Gunnison, Utah
 KVPM in Arvin, California
  in Saint Johns, Arizona
 KWSK-LP in Cason, Texas
  in Mexico, Missouri
  in Lahoma, Oklahoma
 KYBE in Frederick, Oklahoma
 KYNC-LP in Sachse, Texas
 KZLH-LP in Zapata, Texas
 WAFM (United States) in Amory, Mississippi
  in Manlius, New York
  in Graysville, Tennessee
  in Philadelphia, Pennsylvania
 WBHD in Olyphant, Pennsylvania
  in Midfield, Alabama
  in Clearwater, Florida
  in Calvert City, Kentucky
 WCLM-LP in Woodstock, Virginia
  in Oscoda, Michigan
 WCRC (FM) in Effingham, Illinois
 WDKW in Maryville, Tennessee
  in Danville, Vermont
 WELT-LP in Fort Wayne, Indiana
 WFID in Rio Piedras, Puerto Rico
 WFKX in Henderson, Tennessee
  in Farmville, Virginia
 WHAL-FM in Horn Lake, Mississippi
  in Pleasant Hill, Ohio
 WHNJ in Big Pine Key, Florida
  in Ormond-By-The-Sea, Florida
 WHWL in Marquette, Michigan
  in Gibsonburg, Ohio
 WIOL-FM in Greenville, Georgia
 WJDK-FM in Seneca, Illinois
 WKBU in New Orleans, Louisiana
  in Lumberton, North Carolina
  in Hartford-Meriden, Connecticut
 WKXN in Fort Deposit, Alabama
 WLDM-LP in Sanitaria Springs, New York
 WLHF-LP in Champaign, Illinois
  in Grand Rapids, Michigan
 WLPM-LP in Christmas, Florida
 WLXL-LP in Lexington, Kentucky
  in Lewistown, Pennsylvania
 WMTZ-LP in Rutland, Vermont
 WNCG-LP in Mansfield, Ohio
 WPCA-LP in Amery, Wisconsin
  in Olean, New York
 WPLV in Navarre, Florida
 WPMR-LP in Russellville, Alabama
 WQAR-LP in Addison, Michigan
  in Jeffersonville, Indiana
  in Valdosta, Georgia
 WRDI in Nappanee, Indiana
  in Milwaukee, Wisconsin
 WRMA in North Miami Beach, Florida
 WROE-LP in Roanoke, Virginia
 WROF-LP in Floyd, Virginia
  in La Crosse, Wisconsin
 WRXA-LP in Rocky Mount, Virginia
 WSCM in Baldwin, Wisconsin
  in Oregon, Illinois
 WSGD-LP in Lehigh Acres, Florida
  in Craigsville, West Virginia
  in Charleston, Mississippi
 WUKV in Trion, Georgia
 WVKF in Shadyside, Ohio
 WVKL in Norfolk, Virginia
 WNKQ-LP in Kissimmee Florida 
 WVQC-LP in Cincinnati, Ohio
 WWMJ in Ellsworth, Maine
 WXRC in Hickory, North Carolina
 WYCM in Attica, Indiana
 WZID in Manchester, New Hampshire
 WZLP-LP in Loudonville, Ohio

References

Lists of radio stations by frequency